Can Gio Bridge, is a planned cable-stayed bridge to cross over Soài Rạp, a tributary of the Saigon River in Vietnam

Description

Planning and Design
In order to drive between the Nha Be district and Can Gio District in Ho Chi Minh City, motorists currently have to go through the Binh Khanh Ferry Terminal, which has been receiving increasing amounts of traffic and subsequent delays. Trips across the Soai Rap river could take from fifteen to forty five minutes to cross a 1.2 kilometer span.

Since 2007, there were discussions on replacing the Binh Khanh ferrys with a road cable-stayed bridge that would span the Soai Rap river. In 2019, a design was chosen for a three kilometer, four-lane, cable-stayedbridge. One of the bridge's pillars would be shaped similarly to mangrove trees as a reference to the Cần Giờ Mangrove Forest and with the bridge's railing to appear as waves to invoke Can Gio's seaside.

Construction
It was announced to be built under a "Build-Transfer" model, with a budget of 5.3 billion VND, and construction scheduled to begin in 2020. By 2020, the build-transfer model was reconsidered and a restructuring pushed the projected start date for construction to 2022. The location of the bridge was announced to start at the intersection between 15B Street and No. 2 Street in Nha Be District’s Phu Xuan urban area and connect with Rung Sac, 1.8 kilometers south of the Binh Khanh ferry terminal in the Binh Khanh Commune of Can Gio District.

Other projects have been presented as contingent on the completion of the bridge, especially Cần Giờ's coastal tourism site project. The "Cần Giờ Tourism Urban Area" is a 2,870 hectare seaside development initiative that would connect in from the bridge. By  January 2021, concerns were growing about the effects of the project's delays on investment and economic development in the region. In April, officials announced that the bridge would be a higher priority and committed 10 billion VND to the project's completion.

References

Road bridges in Vietnam
Cable-stayed bridges in Vietnam